Amin Yop Christopher (born 6 December 1993) is a Nigerian badminton player. She has participated in major badminton events at both local and international level. She won a gold medal for the mixed team category at the 2019 Rabat African Games held in Casablanca, Morocco.

Achievements

African Championships 
Women's doubles

References

External links 
 

1993 births
Living people
Nigerian female badminton players
Competitors at the 2019 African Games
African Games gold medalists for Nigeria
African Games medalists in badminton
21st-century Nigerian women